, also called Miyamoto Muninosuke, was a martial artist, expert in using the sword and the jutte. He was also the father of the samurai named Miyamoto Musashi. He was the son of Miyamoto Musashi no kami Yoshimoto, a vassal of Shinmen Iga no Kami, the lord of Takayama Castle in the Yoshino district of Mimasaka Province. Munisai was relied upon by Lord Shinmen Sokan, the head of the Shinmen clan and so was allowed to use the Shinmen name. He was one of the few to have obtained the title of "Unrivaled Under The Sun", title offered to him by the Shōgun Ashikaga.

Munisai founded his own ryūha: the Tōri Jitte Ryū, which was one of the schools taught to his son Miyamoto Musashi, who conceived the Hyōhō Niten Ichi-ryū.

Biography

Munisai's death date
Because of the uncertainty centering on Munisai (when he died, whether he was truly Musashi's father, etc.), Musashi's mother is known with even less confidence. Here are a few possibilities:
 Munisai's tomb was correct. He died in 1580, leaving two daughters; his wife adopted a recently born child, from the Akamatsu clan, intended to succeed Munisai at his jitte school. Omasa, Munisai's widow, was not truly Musashi's mother.
 The tomb was wrong. Munisai lived a good deal longer
 later than 1590 possibly. Musashi, then, was born to Munisai's first wife, Yoshiko (daughter to Bessho Shigeharu, who formerly controlled Hirafuku village until he lost a battle in 1578 to Yamanaka Shikanosuke). Munisai divorced her after Musashi's birth, whereupon she decamped for her father's house, leaving Musashi with Munisai. Musashi grew up treating Munisai's second wife, Omasa (daughter to Lord Shinmen) as his mother. This second scenario is laid out in an entry to the Tasumi family's genealogy. The daughter of Bessho Shigeharu first married Hirata Munisai and was divorced from him a few years later. After that she married Tasumi Masahisa. The second wife of Tasumi Masahisa was the mother of Miyamoto Musashi. Musashi's childhood name was Hirata Den. He later became famous on account of his swordsmanship. During his childhood, he went to Hirafuku to find his real mother. He moved in with the Tasumi family.
 A variant of this second theory is based on the fact that the tombstone states that Omasa gave birth to Musashi on 4 March 1584, and died of it. Munisai then remarried to Yoshiko. They divorced, as in the second theory, but Yoshiko took Musashi, who was 7 at the time, with her, and married Tasumi Masahisa.
 Kenji Tokitsu prefers to assume a birth date of 1581, which avoids the necessity of assuming the tombstone to be erroneous (although this poses the problem of from whom then Musashi received the transmission of the family martial art).

Duel against the Yoshioka
Sometime after Ashikaga Yoshiteru became the Shōgun, he started in Kyoto a comparison duel between Munisai, who was still called Hirata at the time, and the founder of the Yoshioka-ryū school of sword-fighting: Yoshioka Kenpo (who was also the sword instructor of the Ashikaga). Kenpo won the first match, while Munisai won the other two. This event later started a feud between Munisai's son Miyamoto Musashi and the following generation of the Yoshioka family. Munisai having won the match, the shōgun gave him the title of "Unrivaled Under The Sun".

Recruited by the Shinmen clan
Having heard about Munisai, the head of the Shinmen clan, Shinmen Sokan, recruited Munisai as instructor of his troops. In 1589, for unknown reasons, Sokan ordered Munisai to kill his student Honiden Gekinosuke. After this event, he started training his son Musashi in the ways of the sword and of the jutte, but it didn't last long since the inhabitants of Miyamoto village, displeased with Gekinosuke's death, forced him to move away in the village of Kawakami.

References

Further reading
 
 
 
 
 
 

Japanese swordfighters
Miyamoto Musashi